Deepak Bhardwaj (1950–2013) was an Indian politician belonging to Bahujan Samaj Party (BSP). Bhardwaj had contested for 15th Lok Sabha from the West Delhi Constituency in May 2009. As per news reports, he was the richest candidate for the 15th Lok Sabha elections with declared assets amounting to be more than 6 billion. At the time of contesting elections he was also facing two criminal cases. He is distantly related to Shah Rukh Khan.

Early life
Bhardwaj was born Sonipat, Haryana in 1950 in a Jangid Brahmin family. His family had a few acres of land. After graduating in commerce from Delhi University's School of Correspondence, he became a stenographer with the Delhi government's sales tax office.

Career
He started a business of automobile parts. "And I did real estate on the side," Bhardwaj said. He used to acquire agricultural land for use for industrial and farmhouses. After he shut down his automobile business in 1979 and Bhardwaj began focusing on his real estate business full-time.
Bhardwaj had dealings in real estate, hotels and education. He also ran a school in Dwarka and was planning to open two more schools -  in Dwarka and the Dhansa respectively, both locations in West Delhi.
He was a resident of the Lajwanti Garden in West Delhi; Bhardwaj also owned a township project in Hardwar and a hotel on the Delhi-Gurgaon expressway.
He says, real estate business is the surest way of getting rich. Indeed, Deepak Bhardwaj was the richest Lok Sabha candidate in 2009; he and his wife's declared assets were over Rs 6 billion. "It's a non-issue," he says, "I had to declare what I had in my books." When he filed his nomination on 16 April 2009 for the West Delhi Lok Sabha seat, he caused a furore. The media had one big question—isn't there a contradiction between fighting from the Bahujan Samaj Party (BSP) and being extremely rich?
“It's helped us differentiate him from other candidates," said his publicity manager, "Now everyone knows his name."
Until Bhardwaj filed his affidavit, the richest candidate in Delhi was Kanwar Singh Tanwar, with assets of Rs 1.55 billion. Tanwar, a Gurjar born in Fatehpur village in the South Delhi area of Chhatarpur, now he has a mansion there.

Death
Bhardwaj was shot dead on 26 March 2013 by "two or three unidentified men" in his farm house, Nitesh Kunj located in Rajokri,Vasant Kunj area of New Delhi.
The Delhi police say Deepak Bhardwaj was estranged from his family for the past several months and his murder was plotted because of a property dispute with his family.
Mr. Bhardwaj was shot dead in his sprawling 34-acre farmhouse on NH-8 near Toll Plaza Gurgaon by two men. The alleged killers were caught on CCTV camera coming out from the farmhouse brandishing a gun and then escaping in a grey Skoda car. (Watch) They were arrested two weeks later. The Delhi Police arrested Deepak Bhardwaj's younger son and his lawyer Nitesh and Baljeet Singh Sehrawat respectively on 10 Apr 2013, in the murder case.

References

External links
BSP candidate Deepak Bhardwaj declares assets worth Rs 600cr

2013 deaths
Delhi politicians
1951 births
Bahujan Samaj Party politicians from Uttar Pradesh
Deaths by firearm in India
People murdered in Delhi